The Holy Mountains Lavra of the Holy Dormition (Sviatohirsk Lavra or the Sviatohirsk Cave Monastery; , Sviatogorskaya Lavra or the Sviatogorsky Cave Monastery) is a major Orthodox Christian monastery on the steep right bank of the Siverskyi Donets River. The name comes from the surrounding Holy Mountains; the Holy Dormition is another term for the death of the Virgin Mary.

The monastery is near the town of Sviatohirsk (so named for the monastery in 2003), in Donetsk Oblast, eastern Ukraine. 
The monastery also forms the centrepiece of the Holy Mountains National Nature Park (established 1997). The Ukrainian Orthodox Church (Moscow Patriarchate) proclaimed it a lavra in 2004.

History 

The first written mention of the monastery dates from 1627, although Sigismund von Herberstein had alluded to the "Holy Mountains" area as early as 1526. It is likely that the first monks settled the area in the 15th century. At the time it was a minor monastic establishment in the Wild Fields regularly ravaged by the Crimean Tatars.

In 1787, Catherine II had it shut down. The monastery's lands were secularized and donated to Prince Grigory Potemkin, the Viceroy of New Russia. One of his heirs, Aleksander Mikhailovich Potemkin, and his wife Tatiana, née Princess Galitzine, financed the monastery's revival and rebuilding, starting in 1844.

Soviet closure 

Before the October Revolution, the Sviatohirsk Monastery owned a worker's shop, windmills, various kinds of repair shops, and trading buildings. The lavra's main Dormition Cathedral was designed by Alexey Gornostaev, who included a traditional Byzantine tower. From 1917 onward, the Bolsheviks plundered and desecrated the monastery on numerous occasions, beating and murdering many monks and in 1922, they shut the monastery down completely, setting up a Sanatorium for the Donbas workers on the grounds.

Before World War I, the monastery was inhabited by approximately 600 monks. During the 1930s, some of the churches were demolished by the Soviets, along with other numerous religious sites throughout the Soviet Union.

Restoration in independent Ukraine 

After the fall of the Soviet Union and the regaining of Ukrainian independence in 1991, the monastery was restored a year later. In 2004, the monastery was officially granted the status of a Ukrainian Orthodox Church lavra. Today, the monastery community consists of more than 100 monks, and is increasing each year.

On October 25, 2005, the National Bank of Ukraine issued its 10-hryvnia commemorative coin depicting the Sviatohirsk Lavra.

2022 Russian shelling 

During the 2022 Russian invasion of Ukraine, the monastery provided shelter to civilian refugees. On 12 March 2022, it was damaged by a Russian airstrike on the nearby bridge across the Donets, at which time about 520 refugees were present in the monastery. The blast from the explosion damaged windows and doors of the monastery buildings, and several people were injured from the glass shards of the shattered windows. On 4 May, repeated shelling wounded 7 people. Later in May, Russian shelling destroyed Our Lady of the Joy of All Who Sorrow Skete, St. George's Skete, damaged St. John of Shanghai Skete and the Church of Holy Martyrs of the Lavra. Two civilians were killed in a shelling attack on the monastery on 1 June. On June 4th, it was reported that Russian shelling had destroyed the Skete of All Saints within the Lavra.

Gallery

See also
Persecution of Christians in the Soviet Union
USSR anti-religious campaign (1917–1921)
USSR anti-religious campaign (1921–1928)
USSR anti-religious campaign (1928–1941)
USSR anti-religious campaign (1958–1964)
USSR anti-religious campaign (1970s–1990)

References

External links 

 Official website
 Svyatogorskaya Blessed Virgin (photo)

Monasteries of the Ukrainian Orthodox Church (Moscow Patriarchate)
Buildings and structures in Donetsk Oblast
Religious buildings and structures completed in 1992
1624 establishments in Europe
Religious organizations established in the 1620s
Donets
Buildings and structures destroyed during the 2022 Russian invasion of Ukraine
Lavras